Phytomelanin (phytomelan) is a black, inert, organic material that forms a crust-like covering of some seeds, commonly found in Asparagales and Asteraceae but uncommon in other taxonomic groupings. Phytomelanin is found in most families of the Asparagales (although not in Orchidaceae). It is mechanically hard and forms a resistant substance, although it is more pliable in the developing fruit, hardening later. Chemically it appears to be a polyvinyl aromatic alcohol, and is  thought to be exuded from the hypodermis. It appears to provide resistance to insect predators and desiccation.

References

Bibliography 

 
 
 

Asparagales
Asteraceae
Phytochemicals